Banjar (pronounced Banjaar) is a town in Kullu district in the state of Himachal Pradesh, India. Banjar is one of the six tehsils of Kullu district.  Culturally, it is a part of the Seraj region that extends from Jalori pass to Shikari Devi in Janjehli. A dialect of Kullavi called Seraji is spoken in the region and the natives are also called Serajis. The tourist attractions of Tirthan valley and Jibhi are a part of the Banjar region with Banjar town being the main marketplace in Tirthan Valley.

River Tirthan flows through Banjar along with the tributary Pushpabhadra flowing through the tourist town of Jibhi. The town of Banjar is located at the confluence of these two rivers. 'Banjar mela ' is the prominent festival of the region which is celebrated each year in the month of May.

The 45 villages clusters in the tehsil rely on the town of Banjar for their major needs. The town has a Government Senior Secondary School, Government Degree Collage, Civil Hospital, Bus Station, Police Station and a Sub Divisional Magistrate's office.

There are many tourist attractions in Banjar, these are the waterfalls of Tirthan valley, Chehni fort of deity Shringa Rishi, Balo temple of deity Balo Nag, Jibhi town, the meadows of Jalori pass and the Great Himalayan National Park etc.

Temperatures can go a few degrees below 0° Celsius in the winter months of December–January and climb up to 30-34° in the peak summer months of June–July. The months of March, April, May, June, September, October, November are considered the best for hiking and exploring the region. The town of Banjar along with other villages by the river Tirthan receive very little snowfall once or twice each winter while the higher reaches of the valley like Shoja, Sharchi, Jalori, etc., receive heavy snowfall.

The tree cover varies from pine forest in the lower reaches of the valley by Tirthan river, Deodar/Cedar forest in the middle region, Fir/Spruce/Oak/Horse Chestnut/Rhododendron in the upper parts followed by the lush meadows above the tree line.

Farming and horticulture are a major source of the local economy along with government jobs and recently booming tourism industry. Major horticulture produce in the lower reaches is centred around pomegranates, plums, pears, apricots, persimmons, walnuts while apples has been the major crop in the upper reaches. Trout fish farming has also become a part of the local economy in the region.

Geography
It is situated at a height of 1356 meters (4515.48 feet) from sea level. The place lies on the alternate route to Kullu from Shimla. The main route is via Bilaspur and Mandi. The alternate route goes from Theog, Aani, Jalori Pass, Banjar and joins the main route at Aut. 
The Banjar Valley is in the middle Himalayan range and going towards the east, the peaks progressively get taller, finally giving way to the great Himalayan range, where peaks have heights of 4500 meters and above. Banjar is one of the tehsil of the Kullu district. C-24 is the name given to Banjar Constituency. Banjar constituency has three Zila Parishad ward names as Khadagad, Plahach, and Raila. The city is growing with rapid speed in the tourism industry.
The valley is also a gateway to The Great Himalayan National Park from its north-eastern side. The town consists of a lot of pocket-friendly and less crowded tourist places and serves as a summer destination. The main source of earning in this area is through agriculture and horticulture. Now tourism and hospitality industry is attracting the locals.

Tirthan and Jibhi valley are the two main attractions in Banjar. Tirthan valley is also known for the Trout fish Valley and its divine beauty. People of Banjar celebrate many festivals like Magh-Sakranti (in January), Faguli (in March), Shairi (in September), and Diwali. People wear woolen clothes. There are many holy places.

Demographics
 India census, Banjar had a population of 1262. Males constitute 55% of the population and females 45%. Banjar has an average literacy rate of 84%, higher than the national average of 59.5%; with 89% of the males and 78% of females literate. 8% of the population is under 6 years of age, of which 52% are male and 48% are female.

Administrative Setup of Banjar Sub Division

Nearest airport 
Though Bhuntar is technically the closest airport, flights tend to be erratic due to the weather. Your best bet is to take the Himachal Tourism (HTPDC) bus to Manali. The state-run bus service is reliable and comfortable compared to private operators, and quite safe for travelers.

An alternate and more relaxed route is via Shimla. Descend down the breathtaking Jalori pass to enter the valleys via charming villages like Shoja and drive through beautiful cedar forests. You can also take a train (or flight) to Chandigarh and take a taxi to the valleys. Alternatively, take the toy train from Kalka to Shimla and drive down from there.

References

Cities and towns in Kullu district